Trouble (known as Frustration in the UK and Kimble in Finland) is a board game in which players compete to be the first to send four pieces all the way around a board. Pieces are moved according to the roll of a die using a contained device called a "Pop-O-Matic". Trouble was developed by the Kohner Brothers and initially manufactured by Irwin Toy Ltd., later by Milton Bradley (now part of Hasbro). The game was launched in America in 1965. The classic version is now marketed by Winning Moves Games USA. The gameplay, board, and concept is derivative of the British board game Ludo, itself based on the Indian board game pachisi.

A similar game called Headache was also produced by the Milton Bradley Company; besides a different track layout, its pawns are conical, in contrast to the cylindrical pieces used in Trouble.

Gameplay 
Players can send opponents' pieces back to the start by landing on them. Teaming is not allowed in the game. Pieces are protected from capture after arriving in the final four slots. Unlike more complex race games such as Parcheesi, counters cannot be maneuvered to block opponents' moves.

The most notable feature of Trouble is the "Pop-O-Matic" die container. This device is a clear plastic hemisphere containing the die, placed over a flexible sheet. Players roll the die by pressing down quickly on the bubble, which flexes the sheet and causes the die to tumble upon its rebound. The Pop-O-Matic container produces a popping sound when it is used, and prevents the die from being lost (and players from cheating by improper rolling). It allows for quick die rolls, and players' turns can be performed in rapid succession. The die is imprinted with Arabic numerals rather than the traditional circular pips (though the circular pips are used in the Travel version, which contains a cover to keep the pegs from being lost).

Players may move pieces out of their start only when the die lands on 6. Getting a 6 at any point in the game also allows the player to take another turn, even if the player cannot move any of their pieces (as they cannot land on any of their own pieces). They can also move a new piece out even if they have another piece currently in play, and can also do the same if another player's piece is occupying their "start" space, but cannot do so when one of their own pieces is occupying their "start" space.

If the die in the "Pop-O-Matic" container has not clearly landed on a number, then the player who popped it can tap the "Pop-O-Matic", but may not re-pop while the die is in limbo.

Editions
Double Trouble (1987) was originally published by Milton Bradley. It is currently being produced in the USA by Winning Moves Games USA. Each player moves two pieces along a path, using separate Pop-o-Matic dice-roller devices.

References

External links 
 

Board games introduced in 1965
Cross and circle games
Children's board games
Roll-and-move board games
Milton Bradley Company games
Articles containing video clips